Guanchia is a genus of earwigs in the family Forficulidae. There are more than 30 described species in Guanchia.

Species
These 34 species belong to the genus Guanchia:

 Guanchia bandamaensis Martin, 1978
 Guanchia bicarinata Hincks, 1947
 Guanchia biturberculata (Brindle, 1966)
 Guanchia brevitarsis (Chopard, 1942)
 Guanchia brignolii (Taglianti, 1974)
 Guanchia cabrerae (Bolivar, 1893)
 Guanchia canariensis (Burr, 1905)
 Guanchia chirurga Burr, 1911
 Guanchia circinata (Finot, 1893)
 Guanchia crassa (Brindle, 1978)
 Guanchia distendens (Brindle, 1975)
 Guanchia fernandezi Martin, 1978
 Guanchia gomerensis Martin, 1978
 Guanchia guancharia (Heller, 1907)
 Guanchia hincksi (Burr, 1947)
 Guanchia kaznakovi (Semenov, 1908)
 Guanchia lucens (Brindle, 1975)
 Guanchia medica Burr, 1911
 Guanchia obtusangula (Krauss, 1904)
 Guanchia palmensis Baez, 1986
 Guanchia pubescens (Géné, 1837)
 Guanchia rehni (Burr, 1952)
 Guanchia rugosula (Hincks, 1957)
 Guanchia schmitzi (Borelli, 1906)
 Guanchia sjoestedti (Burr, 1907)
 Guanchia sokotrana (Burr, 1905)
 Guanchia storai Chopard, 1942
 Guanchia storåi Chopard, 1942
 Guanchia taylori (Popham, 1983)
 Guanchia tenerifensis Martin, 1978
 Guanchia transversa Brindle, 1968
 Guanchia triangulata (Hincks, 1950)
 Guanchia uvarovi (Semenov Tian-Shansky & Bey-Bienko, 1935)
 Guanchia uxoris (Heller, 1907)

References

Further reading

External links

 

Forficulidae
Dermaptera genera